Scoble may refer to:

People
 Robert Scoble (born 1965), a technical evangelist who worked for Microsoft until 2006 and maintains the popular blog, Scobleizer
 John Scoble (1799–1877), a British abolitionist and political figure in Canada West
 Jesse Scoble (born mid-70s), is a writer and narrative designer of both computer games and role-playing games.

Places
Scoble, South Pool, an historic estate in Devon